How to Stop Brexit (And Make Britain Great Again) is a book by Nick Clegg, former Deputy Prime Minister of the United Kingdom, Leader of the Liberal Democrats and MP for Sheffield Hallam. It is published by The Bodley Head and was released on 12 October 2017.

Background
The author makes the case that Brexit is not inevitable, despite the result of the EU referendum in 2016. He argues that the referendum was fought on the basis of misleading information and so it would not be undemocratic for the UK to change its mind about the result. The book addresses the issue of how to prevent Brexit through tactical voting and also suggests ways in which the referendum result could ultimately lead to a beneficial reform of the EU.

Reception
Writing for The Independent, Andrew Grice recommended the book to any remain voters "feeling as gloomy as Philip Hammond looks".
In The Times, Daniel Johnson stated that Clegg is out to "name and shame the guilty men whom he holds responsible for Brexit", but pointed out that he "loses credibility by indicting only Brexiteers".

References

External links
How To Stop Brexit (And Make Britain Great Again) at The Bodley Head.

2017 non-fiction books
Books about politics of the United Kingdom
Nick Clegg
The Bodley Head books
Works about Brexit